The Patriotic Revival Party (PRP) is a political party in Benin led by Janvier Yahouédéhou.

History
Yahouédéhou was nominated as the party's candidate for the 2011 presidential elections. He finished sixth in a field of 14 candidates with 0.56% of the vote. In the parliamentary elections later in the year, the party received 1.5% of the vote, failing to win a seat.

The party contested the 2015 parliamentary elections in alliance with the Benin Rebirth Party. The two parties received 7% of the vote, winning seven seats and becoming the fourth-largest faction in the National Assembly.

References

Political parties in Benin
Political parties with year of establishment missing